This paleoentomology list records new  fossil insect taxa that are to be described during the year 2022, as well as notes other significant paleoentomology discoveries and events which occurred during that year.

Clade Amphiesmenoptera

Lepidoptera

Lepidopteran research
 A description of new specimens of caterpillars from the Cretaceous Burmese amber, expanding the morphological diversity of Cretaceous caterpillars, is published by Gauweiler et al. (2022), who also attempt to determine whether Cretaceous caterpillars might have represented an adequate food source for early birds.
 Review of the fossil record of caterpillars in Dominican and Mexican amber, including description of new specimens, is published by Haug et al. (2022).

Tarachoptera

Trichoptera

Other amphiesmenopterans

Other amphiesmenopteran research
 Khramov, Naugolnykh & Węgierek (2022) report the presence of elongate mouthparts with similar morphology to those of some present-day nectarivorous beetles and hymenopterans in Permian protomeropids from Russia, representing the earliest record of insects with siphonate-like mouthparts, which were possibly used to gather sugary fluids from the semi-closed ovulate organs of the gymnosperms of a peltaspermalean affinity known from the same locality.

Clade Antliophora

Dipterans

Brachycerans

Nematocerans

Dipteran research
 A redescription of Minyohelea nexuosa, based on data from a new specimen from the Lower Cretaceous Lebanese amber, is published by Pielowska-Ceranowska, Azar & Szwedo (2022).
 A review of the fossil record of the subfamily Microphorinae is published by Shamshev & Perkovsky (2022).

Mecoptera

Clade Archaeorthoptera

†Cnemidolestida

Orthopterans

Orthopteran research
 Putative liomopterid Alekhosara reticulata is reinterpreted as a possible locustavid caeliferan, and thus possibly the oldest known caeliferan, by Aristov & Gorochov (2022).
 Evidence of the presence of the earliest tympanal ears and sound-producing system in exceptionally preserved Mesozoic katydids, interpreted as indicating that katydids evolved a high diversity of singing frequencies at least by the Late Triassic, and complex acoustic communication at least by the Middle Jurassic, is presented by Xu et al. (2022).

†Titanoptera

Other panorthopterans

Clade Coleopterida

Coleopterans

Adephaga

Archostemata

Myxophaga

†Protocoleoptera

Protocoleopteran research
 A study on the anatomy and affinities of Coleopsis archaica is published by Schädel, Yavorskaya & Beutel (2022).
 A study on the anatomy and phylogenetic affinities of members of the family Tshekardocoleidae is published by Boudinot et al. (2022), who name new clades Mesocoleoptera (containing all coleopterans except tshekardocoleids) and Metacoleoptera (containing all mesocoleopterans except permocupedids).

Polyphaga

Bostrichiformia

Cucujiformia

Cucujiform research
 Description of new specimens of scraptiid larvae with large, elongated terminal ends from the Eocene Baltic amber and Cretaceous Burmese amber (the latter representing the oldest record of these larvae reported to date), and a study on the morphological variation of these larvae is published by Zippel et al. (2022).
 Revision of the fossil lymexylids originally assigned to the genus Raractocetus is published by Li et al. (2022), who transfer the species Raractocetus balticus, R. extinctus, R. fossilis and R. sverlilo to the genus Cretoquadratus, and consider the species Cretoquadratus engeli to be a junior synonym of Cretoquadratus fossilis.

Elateriformia

Elateriform research
 The first fossil larva of a representative of Elmidae reported to date is described from the Eocene Baltic amber by Zippel et al. (2022).

Scarabaeiformia

Scarabaeiform research
 Cretaceous scarabaeoid Mesoceratocanthus, originally assigned to the family Hybosoridae, is reinterpreted as a member of the passaloid lineage including the families Passalopalpidae and Passalidae (probably closely related to the extinct family Passalopalpidae) by Li et al. (2022).

Staphyliniformia

Staphyliniform research
 A larva of an ant-like stone beetle, similar to the second stage larvae of extant Stenomastigus longicornis and likely belonging to the group Mastigini, is described from the Cretaceous amber from Myanmar by Haug et al. (2022).

Clade Dictyoptera

Dictyopteran research
 An assemblage of specimens of Subioblatta madygenica, with several specimens preserving the coloration on wings, is described from the Triassic Madygen Formation (Kyrgyzstan) by Hinkelman (2022).
 Probable termite coprolites with different proportions are described from the Lower Cretaceous Huolinhe Formation (Huolinhe Basin, China) by Dong et al. (2022), who interpret this finding as indicating that the Early Cretaceous termites from the Huolinhe Basin had wood-feeding habits, and suggesting that the division of labor among termites already existed in the Early Cretaceous.
 Borings filled with coprolites similar to those produced by extant termites belonging to the family Kalotermitidae are described from silicified conifer woods from the Albian Kachaike Formation (Argentina) by Greppi et al. (2022), who interpret the presence of kalotermitids as indicative of arid climatic conditions.

†Glosselytrodea

Hymenopterans

"Symphyta"

"Symphytan" research
 A study on the phylogenetic affinities of the Oligocene pamphiliid Tapholyda caplani is published by Jouault et al. (2022), who transfer this species to the subfamily Juralydinae.

Apocrita

Apoidea

Chalcidoidea

Chrysidoidea

Diaprioidea

Evanioidea

Formicoidea

Ichneumonoidea

Mymarommatoidea

Proctotrupoidea

Serphitoidea

Stephanoidea

Tiphioidea

Other Apocrita

Apocritan research
 A bethylid specimen belonging to the genus Eupsenella (currently confined to Australia and New Zealand and with the fossil record previously only known from the Old World) is described from the Eocene Green River Formation by Brazidec & Perrichot (2022).
 Richter et al. (2022) describe almost completely preserved internal head structures of a specimen of Gerontoformica gracilis from the Cretaceous amber from Myanmar.
 Zhuang et al. (2022) describe a female specimen of Zigrasimecia with exceptionally preserved soft tissues from the Cretaceous amber from Myanmar.

Clade Neuropterida

Megaloptera

Megalopteran research
 A review of the fossil record of megalopteran and megalopteran-like larvae, including descriptions of new larvae from the Cretaceous Burmese amber, Eocene Green River Formation and Miocene Foulden Maar fossil site (New Zealand), is published by Baranov et al. (2022).

Neuroptera

Neuropteran research
 A study on the fossil record of aphidlions and aphidlion-like lacewing larvae, including reports of new specimens from the Cretaceous Burmese amber and Eocene Baltic amber and a study on the morphological diversity of the heads of the fossil larvae, is published by Haug et al. (2022).
 Haug et al. (2022) describe an aphidlion-like larva from the Cretaceous Burmese amber, preserved in close proximity to an empty egg case, and interpreted by the authors as likely representing the first newly hatched aphidlion-like larva reported from the Burmese amber.
 A hemerobiid aphidlion preserved with possible Cf. Germaraphis prey, representing the first possible case of a cooccurrence of predator and prey for lacewing larvae reported to date, is described from a piece of the Eocene Baltic amber by Haug et al. (2022).
 An overview of the diversity and fossil record of the larvae of the families Ithonidae, Sisyridae and Coniopterygidae is published by Haug et al. (2022).
 Two probable berothid larvae with extremely enlarged trunks are described from a single piece of the Cretaceous Kachin amber from Myanmar by Haug & Haug (2022), representing the oldest case of the extreme inflation of the trunk in insects reported to date.

Raphidioptera

Raphidiopteran research
 A study on the morphological diversity of snakefly larvae over the last 100 million years is published by Haug et al. (2022), who also describe new specimens of larval snakeflies preserved in Eocene and Cretaceous ambers.
 Makarkin et al. (2022) describe snakefly larvae from the Eocene Sakhalinian amber (the first confirmed representative of Raphidioptera from the Cenozoic of Asia) and Rovno amber (representing the first European Cenozoic immature snakefly found outside of Russo-Scandia).

Clade †Palaeodictyopteroidea

†Megasecoptera

†Palaeodictyoptera

Palaeodictyopteran research
 A study on the abdominal lateral outgrowths (flaps) of Paleozoic palaeodictyopteran larvae is published by Prokop et al. (2022), who report that these flaps show comparable structure to thoracic wings, and most likely represent wing serial homologues.

Clade Palaeoptera

Ephemeroptera

Odonatoptera

Odonatopteran research
 A study on the diversity of color patterns among Early Jurassic heterophlebiids is published by Jouault et al. (2022), who identify five different patterns of coloration in the studied fossil material, and interpret the appearance of patterns of colored spots and bands on the studied heterophlebiid wings as likely caused by the increase of the predation pressure by pterosaurs.

Clade †Paoliidea

†Paoliida

Clade Paraneoptera

Hemipterans

Auchenorrhyncha

Coleorrhyncha

Heteroptera

Heteropteran research 
 Fu et al. (2022) describe adult females of the water boatman Karataviella popovi from the Middle–Late Jurassic Daohugou biota (China) bearing clutches of eggs on their left mesotibia, representing the earliest direct evidence of brood care among insects reported to date.
 Redescription of Eocenocydnus lisi is published by Lis (2022), who assigns this species to the tribe Cydnini within the family Cydnidae.

Sternorrhyncha

Sternorrhyncha research 
 A redescription of Khatangaphis sibirica is published by Ogłaza, Perkovsky & Węgierek (2022).
 A redescription of Canadaphis mordvilkoi, based on data from a new specimen from the Cretaceous amber from the Kheta Formation (Taymyr Peninsula, Krasnoyarsk Krai, Russia), is published by Ogłaza, Perkovsky & Węgierek (2022).

Psocodea

Thysanoptera

Clade Perlidea

Dermapterans

Embioptera

Phasmatodea

Plecopterans

Plecopteran research
 A study on the diversity dynamics of plecopterans throughout their evolutionary history, based on data from the fossil record, is published by Jouault et al. (2022)

Clade †Reculida

Other insects

General research
 A study on the diversity dynamics of insects during the Permian and Triassic is published by Jouault et al. (2022), who find a pattern with three extinctions at the Roadian/Wordian, Permian/Triassic and Ladinian/Carnian boundaries, assess the effect of diversity changes between three or four guilds (herbivores, predators, detritivores/fungivores and generalists), and attempt to determine the factors influencing insect diversification dynamics throughout the Permian and Triassic.
 Conspecific aggregations of insects (dermapterans, neuropterans, orthopterans) and springtails are described from the Cretaceous Burmese amber by Hörnig et al. (2022), who attempt to determine whether these fossils could represent evidence of social behaviour.
 A flat wasp female preserved grasping and possibly stinging a beetle is described from the Cretaceous Burmese amber by Kiesmüller et al. (2022).

References 

2022 in paleontology
Paleoentomology